The University of the Philippines Fighting Maroons is the official women's volleyball team of the University of the Philippines. Founded in the same year as the first season of its major league, UAAP, the Lady Fighting Maroons are the first-ever champions of the said collegiate league.

Current roster 

Legend
 Team Captain
 Import
 Draft Pick
 Rookie
 Inactive
 Suspended
 Free Agent
 Injured

Training pool 
This is the list of UP Lady Maroons pool of players.

Previous rosters

The 14-women line-up of the Lady Fighting Maroons for UAAP Season 81 volleyball tournaments:

Head coach:
  Godfrey Okumu
Assistant coach:
  Jose Mari Angulo
Trainer
  Wendel Miguel
  Joyce Antonniette Palad

Team manager
  Andrea Preciosa Lagman
Team Statistician
  Monica Ortiz
Physical Therapist
  Lea Diana Acantilado

Legend
 Team Captain
 Import
 Draft Pick
 Rookie
 Inactive
 Suspended
 Free Agent
 Injured

The line-up of the Lady Fighting Maroons for UAAP Season 80 volleyball tournaments:

Head coach
  Godfrey Okumu
Assistant coach
  Jose Mari Angulo
Team manager
  Andrea Preciosa Lagman
| valign="top" |

Doctor
 

Physical Therapist
  Lea Diana Acantilado

Legend
 Team Captain
 Import
 Draft Pick
 Rookie
 Inactive
 Suspended
 Free Agent
 Injured

The 14-women line-up of the Lady Fighting Maroons for UAAP Season 79:

Head coach
  Jerry Yee
Assistant Coach(es)
  Katrina De Lara
  Rald Ricafort
Team manager
  Cecile Ronquillo
| valign="top" |

Doctor
 

Physical Therapist
  Ma. Crisanta P. Prieto

 Team Captain
 Import
 Draft Pick
 Rookie
 Inactive
 Suspended
 Free Agent
 Injured

For the 2018 Premier Volleyball League Collegiate Conference:

Head coach:
  Godfrey Okumu
Assistant coach:
  Jose Mari Angulo
Trainer
  Wendel Miguel
  Joyce Antonniette Palad

Team manager
  Andrea Preciosa Lagman
Team Statistician
  Monica Ortiz
Physical Therapist
  Lea Diana Acantilado

Legend
 Team Captain
 Import
 Draft Pick
 Rookie
 Inactive
 Suspended
 Free Agent
 Injured

The line-up of the Lady Fighting Maroons for Premier Volleyball League 1st Season Collegiate Conference:

Head coach
  Jerry Yee
Assistant Coach(es)
  Katrina De Lara
  Rald Ricafort
Team manager
  Cecile Ronquillo
| valign="top" |

Doctor
 

Physical Therapist
  Ma. Crisanta P. Prieto

Legend
 Team Captain
 Import
 Draft Pick
 Rookie
 Guest Player
 Inactive
 Suspended
 Free Agent
 Injured

The line-up of the Lady Fighting Maroons for Premier Volleyball League 1st Season Open Conference:

Head coach
  Jerry Yee
Assistant Coach(es)
  Katrina De Lara
  Rald Ricafort
Team manager
  Cecile Ronquillo
| valign="top" |

Doctor
 

Physical Therapist
  Ma. Crisanta P. Prieto

 Team Captain
 Import
 Draft Pick
 Guest Player
 Rookie
 Inactive
 Suspended
 Free Agent
 Injured

The line-up of the Lady Fighting Maroons for 2018 PSL Invitational Cup:

Head coach
  Godfrey Okumu
Assistant coach
  Jose Mari Angulo
  Joyce Antonniette Palad
Team manager
  Andrea Preciosa Lagman
| valign="top" |

Trainer
  Wendel Miguel
Physical Therapist
  Lea Diana Acantilado

Legend
 Team Captain
 Import
 Draft Pick
 Rookie
 Inactive
 Suspended
 Free Agent
 Injured

The 14-women line-up of the Lady Fighting Maroons for 2018 PSL Collegiate Grand Slam Conference:

Head coach:
  Godfrey Okumu
Assistant coach:
  Jose Mari Angulo
Trainer
  Wendel Miguel
  Joyce Antonniette Palad

Team manager
  Andrea Preciosa Lagman
Team Statistician
  Monica Ortiz
Physical Therapist
  Lea Diana Acantilado

Legend
 Team Captain
 Import
 Draft Pick
 Rookie
 Inactive
 Suspended
 Free Agent
 Injured

For the 2018 Philippine University Games:

Head coach
  Godfrey Okumu
Assistant coach
  Jose Mari Angulo
  Joyce Antonniette Palad
Team manager
  Andrea Preciosa Lagman
| valign="top" |

Trainer
  Wendel Miguel
Physical Therapist
  Lea Diana Acantilado

Legend
 Team Captain
 Import
 Draft Pick
 Rookie
 Inactive
 Suspended
 Free Agent
 Injured

Results
The results of the games of the UP Lady Fighting Maroons.

Notes:
  - The team ended the season in fifth place.

Notes:
  - The team ended the season in sixth place.
  - The team played under the name UP-United Auctioneers Lady Fighting Maroons sponsored by the United Auctioneers Inc. They finished at eighth place.
  - The team grabbed the first major championship title after 36 years.
  - The team finished the league at third place, bagging the bronze medal.
  - The team bagged the first-ever PSL Collegiate Grand Slam championship.

Team honors
UAAP Volleyball Tournament

Premier Volleyball League

Philippine Super Liga

Founders' Cup - Philippines

PVF National Inter-Collegiate

Philippine University Games

Philippine National Games

Individual honors

Records by season

Notable players

 Angeli Pauline Araneta
- UAAP Season 77 - Team Captain

 Mae Angeli Basarte
- 2016 PVF National Inter-Collegiate  - Best Setter

 Katherine Adrielle Bersola
- UAAP Season 76 - Team Captain
- UAAP Season 76 - Best Blocker
- 2015 Shakey's V-League Season 12 Reinforced - 1st Best Middle Blocker
- 2016 Shakey's V-League Season 13 Open Conference - 2nd Best Middle Blocker
- 2018 Premier Volleyball League Open Conference - 2nd Best Middle Blocker
- 2019 Premier Volleyball League Reinforced Conference - 1st Best Middle Blocker

 Diana Mae Carlos
- UAAP Seasons 80 & 81 Team captain
- 2018 PSL Collegiate Grand Slam Conference - Most Valuable Player
- 2018 PSL Collegiate Grand Slam Conference - 1st Best Outside Spiker
- 2019 PVL Open Conference - Best Opposite Spiker

 Sheena Mae Chopitea
- 2015 Shakey's V-League Season 12 Reinforced - 2nd Best Middle Blocker

 Justine Dorog
- 2014 Asian Youth Girls Volleyball national team member

 Jewel Hannah Ysabel Encarnacion
- UAAP Season 84 - Team Captain
- 2019 Thailand Sealect Tuna Volleyball Championship U-23 national team member

 Maria Arielle Estrañero
- UAAP Season 79 - Team Captain

 Princess Ira Gaiser
- 2015 Philippine National Games Volleyball Tournament  - Best Libero

 Aieshalaine Gannaban
- 2018 PSL Collegiate Grand Slam Conference - 1st Best Middle Blocker
- 2018 Premier Volleyball League Collegiate - 2nd Best Middle Blocker

 Jewel Hannah Lai
- 2015 Philippine National Games Volleyball Tournament  - Best Setter

 Maristela Gene Layug
- 2014 Asian Youth Girls Volleyball national team member

 Nicole Anne Magsarile
- 2014 Asian Youth Girls Volleyball national team member

 Maria Lina Isabel Molde
- UAAP Season 78 - Rookie of the Year
- 2016 Shakey's V-League Season 13 Collegiate - 1st Best Outside Spiker
- 2018 Premier Volleyball League Collegiate - 1st Best Outside Spiker
- 2018 Premier Volleyball League Collegiate - Conference Most Valuable Player
- 2018 Premier Volleyball League Collegiate - Finals Most Valuable Player
- 2014 Asian Youth Girls Volleyball national team member
- 2019 Philippines U-23 National Team - Team Captain

 Roselyn Rosier
- UAAP Season 82 - Team Captain
- 2014 Asian Youth Girls Volleyball national team member
- 2019 Thailand Sealect Tuna Volleyball Championship U-23 national team member

 Elise Patricia Siao
- 2016 PVF National Inter-Collegiate  - Best Receiver

 Nicole Anne Tiamzon
- 2019 Premier Volleyball League Reinforced Conference - 1st Best Outside Spiker

Former players

 Vina Vera Alinas (L)
 Angeli Pauline Araneta (MB)
 Katherine Adrielle Bersola (MB)
 Marian Alisa Buitre (OPP/MB)
 Pia Cayetano (OH)
 Maria Arielle Estrañero (S/L/OH)
 Princess Ira Gaiser (L)
 Jewel Hannah Lai (S)
 Alyssa Layug (MB)
 Carmela Lopez (OH)
 Hannah Mangulabnan (OH)
 Jed Montero (OH)
 Nicole Tiamzon (OH/OP/S)

*Legend: OH (Outside Hitter), OP (Opposite Hitter), MB (Middle Blocker), S (Setter), L (Libero)

References 

University of the Philippines
University Athletic Association of the Philippines women's volleyball teams